Boccoli is a surname. Notable people with the surname include:

 Benedicta Boccoli (born 1966), Italian theater and movie actress
 Brigitta Boccoli (born 1972), Italian film and television actress
 Gustavo Boccoli (born 1978), Brazilian-born Israeli footballer

Italian-language surnames